Lantana is a genus of about 150 species of perennial flowering plants in the verbena family, Verbenaceae. They are native to tropical regions of the Americas and Africa but exist as an introduced species in numerous areas, especially in the Australian-Pacific region, South and Northeastern part of India. Their common names are shrub verbenas or lantanas. The generic name originated in Late Latin, where it refers to the unrelated Viburnum lantana.

Lantana's aromatic flower clusters (called umbels) are a mix of red, orange, yellow, or blue and white florets. Other colors exist as new varieties are being selected. The flowers typically change color as they mature, resulting in inflorescences that are two- or three-colored.

"Wild lantanas" are plants of the unrelated genus Abronia, usually called "sand-verbenas".

Ecology

Some species are invasive, and are considered to be noxious weeds, such as in South Asia, Southern Africa and Australia. In the United States, lantanas are naturalized in the southeast, especially coastal regions of the Carolinas, Georgia, Florida, and the Gulf Coast.

The spread of lantana is aided by the fact that their leaves are poisonous to most animals and thus avoided by herbivores, while their fruit is a delicacy for many birds, including the yellow-fronted white-eye of Vanuatu, the superb fairy-wren in Australia, the scaly-breasted munia, and the Mauritius bulbul in the Mascarenes; these distribute the seeds and thereby unwittingly contribute to the degradation of their home ecosystem.

Biological control of introduced lantanas has been attempted, without robust success. In Australia, about 30 insects have been introduced in an attempt to control the spread of lantanas, and this has caused problems of its own. The lantana bug (Aconophora compressa) for example is a polyphagous species introduced in 1995 that feeds on dozens of plants, and not only has it failed to have a noticeable impact on the lantana population, it has even become a pest in horticulture, parasitizing the related fiddlewoods (Citharexylum). The small Lantana-feeding moths Epinotia lantana and Lantanophaga pusillidactyla, while not becoming pests, have nonetheless failed to stem the spread of the invasive weed, as has the lantana scrub-hairstreak butterfly (Strymon bazochii) which was introduced to control lantanas on the Hawaiian Islands.

Other Lepidoptera whose caterpillars feed on lantana species include the common splendid ghost moth (Aenetus ligniveren), Aenetus scotti, Endoclita malabaricus, Hypercompe orsa and the setaceous Hebrew character (Xestia c-nigrum). The swamp wallaby (Wallabia bicolor) is one of the few mammals that eat lantana leaves without apparent ill effect.

Lantanas are useful as honey plants, and Spanish flag (L. camara), L. lilacina and L. trifolia are sometimes planted for this purpose, or in butterfly gardening. Butterflies which are attracted to lantana flowers are most notably Papilioninae (swallowtail and birdwing butterflies). Hesperiidae (skippers) and certain brush-footed butterflies (namely Danainae and Heliconiinae), as well as some Pieridae (e.g. cloudless sulphur, Phoebis sennae), Lycaenidae (e.g. the aforementioned lantana scrub-hairstreak), and Nymphalidae (e.g. Greta oto) also like to visit the plants' flowers. Consequently, as total eradication of Lantana seems often impossible, it may in many cases be better to simply remove plants with immature (green) fruit to prevent them from spreading.

Some weaverbirds such as the black-throated weaver (Ploceus benghalensis) and the streaked weaver (P. manyar) highly value Lantana flowers for decorating their nests. An ability to procure spectacular and innovative decorations appears to be desired by females, and consequently is an indicator of the males' fitness.

In Australia it has been found that removing Lantana from urban greenspaces can have negative impacts on bird diversity locally, as it provides refuge for species like the superb fairy (Malurus cyaneus) and silvereye (Zosterops lateralis) in the absence of native plant equivalents. There seems to be a density threshold in which too much Lantana (thus homogeneity in vegetation cover) can lead to a decrease in bird species richness or abundance.

Ceratobasidium cornigerum is a higher fungus which parasitizes Lantana among other plants. The sweet potato whitefly (Bemisia tabaci) is a common greenhouse pest and is often distributed with infested lantanas.

Lantana species, especially L. camara, contain pentacyclic triterpenoids that cause hepatotoxicity and photosensitivity when ingested by grazing animals such as sheep, goats, bovines, and horses. This has led to widespread livestock loss in the United States, South Africa, India, Mexico, and Australia.

Uses

Lantana species are widely cultivated for their flowers in tropical and subtropical environments and (as an annual plant) in temperate climates.

Most of the plants sold as lantana are either Spanish flag (species of section Lantana and their hybrids, including L. camara, L. depressa, L. hirsuta, L. horrida, L. splendens, L. strigocamara, etc.), or trailing lantana (L. montevidensis). Numerous cultivars of the Spanish flag exist, including 'Irene', 'Christine' and 'Dallas Red' (all tall-growing cultivars) and several recently introduced shorter ones. The shorter cultivars may flower more prolifically than the taller ones. Lantana montevidensis gives blue (or white) flowers all year round. Its foliage is dark green and has a distinct odor.

Although lantanas are generally hardy and, being somewhat toxic, usually rejected by herbivores, they may still become infested with pests.

The edibility of Lantana berries is contested. Some experts claim Lantana berries are edible when ripe though like many other kinds of fruit, they are mildly poisonous if eaten while still green. Other experts claim that experimental research indicates that both unripe and ripe Lantana berries are potentially lethal, despite the claims by others that ripe berries are not poisonous.

Extracts of Lantana camara may be used for protection of cabbage against the aphid Lipaphis erysimi.

The Soliga, Korava and Palliyar tribal people of the MM Hills in southern Karnataka, India use lantana to produce roughly 50 different products. It is considered a "near match" to highly priced alternatives, cane and bamboo. Furniture made from lantana is resistant to sun, rain, and termite damage.

Species 
The following species are recognised by The Plant List:

Lantana achyranthifolia Desf.
Lantana × aculeata L.
Lantana alainii Moldenke
Lantana amoena Ridl.
Lantana angolensis Moldenke
Lantana angustibracteata Hayek
Lantana angustifolia Mill.
Lantana aristeguietae Moldenke
Lantana × bahamensis Britton
Lantana balansae Briq.
Lantana balsamifera Britton
Lantana buchii Urb.
Lantana caatingensis Moldenke
Lantana camara L.
Lantana canescens Kunth
Lantana caracasana Turcz.
Lantana chamissonis Benth. ex B.D.Jacks.
Lantana chiapasensis Moldenke
Lantana ciferriana Ekman ex Moldenke
Lantana coimbrensis S.Moore
Lantana colombiana López-Pal.
Lantana cordatibracteata Moldenke
Lantana costaricensis Hayek
Lantana cubensis Moldenke
Lantana cujabensis Schauer
Lantana demutata Millsp.
Lantana depressa Small
Lantana dinteri Moldenke
Lantana dwyeriana Moldenke
Lantana ebrenbergiana Moldenke
Lantana elenievskii I.E.Mendez
Lantana × entrerriensis Tronc.
Lantana exarata Urb. & Ekman
Lantana ferreyrae Moldenke
Lantana fiebrigii Hayek
Lantana × flava Medik.
Lantana × floridana Raf.
Lantana fucata Lindl.
Lantana glaziovii Moldenke
Lantana gracilis T.R.S.Silva
Lantana grisebachii Stuck. ex Seckt
Lantana grossiserrata Moldenke
Lantana hatoensis Moldenke
Lantana hatschbachii Moldenke
Lantana haughtii Moldenke
Lantana hirsuta M.Martens & Galeotti
Lantana hirta Graham
Lantana hodgei R.W.Sanders
Lantana horrida Kunth
Lantana humuliformis Verdc.
Lantana hypoleuca Briq.
Lantana indica Roxb.
Lantana insularis Moldenke
Lantana involucrata L.
Lantana jaliscana Moldenke
Lantana jamaicensis Britton
Lantana kingii Moldenke
Lantana langlassei Moldenke
Lantana leonardorum Moldenke
Lantana leucocarpa Urb. & Ekman ex Moldenke
Lantana lindmanii Briq.
Lantana lockhardtii D.Don ex Schauer
Lantana lopez-palacii Moldenke
Lantana lucida Schauer
Lantana lundiana Schauer
Lantana machadoi R.Fern.
Lantana magnibracteata Tronc.
Lantana megapotamica (Spreng.) Tronc.
Lantana melissiodorifera Perr.
Lantana micrantha Briq.
Lantana microcarpa Urb.
Lantana moldenkei R.Fern.
Lantana mollis Graham
Lantana montevidensis (Spreng.) Briq.
Lantana × mutabilis Weigel
Lantana nivea Vent.
Lantana notha Moldenke
Lantana obtusata Briq.
Lantana ovatifolia Britton
Lantana parvifolia Desf.
Lantana pastazensis Moldenke
Lantana pauciflora Urb.
Lantana pavonii Moldenke
Lantana peduncularis Andersson
Lantana petitiana A.Rich.
Lantana planifolia (Cham.) Briq.
Lantana pohliana Schauer
Lantana prostrata Larrañaga
Lantana punctulata Moldenke
Lantana radula Sw.
Lantana reineckii Briq.
Lantana reptans Hayek
Lantana reticulata Pers.
Lantana riedeliana Schauer
Lantana robusta Schauer
Lantana × rubra Berland.
Lantana rugosa Thunb.
Lantana rugulosa Kunth
Lantana ruiz-teranii López-Pal. & Steyerm.
Lantana rusbyana Moldenke
Lantana salicifolia Kunth
Lantana salzmannii Schauer
Lantana santosii Moldenke
Lantana scabiosiflora Kunth
Lantana scabrida Aiton
Lantana scandens Moldenke
Lantana soatensis Moldenke
Lantana splendens Medik.
Lantana sprucei Hayek
Lantana × strigocamara R.W.Sanders
Lantana strigosa (Griseb.) Urb.
Lantana subcordata Urb.
Lantana subtracta Hiern
Lantana svensonii Moldenke
Lantana swynnertonii Moldenke
Lantana tetragona (Forssk.) Schweinf.
Lantana tilcarensis Tronc.
Lantana tomasii Moldenke
Lantana trifolia L.
Lantana ukambensis (Vatke) Verdc.
Lantana undulata Schrank
Lantana urticoides Hayek
Lantana velutina M.Martens & Galeotti
Lantana veronicifolia Hayek
Lantana viburnoides (Forssk.) Vahl
Lantana viscosa Pohl ex Schauer
Lantana weberbaueri Hayek
Lantana xenica Moldenke
Lantana zahlbruckneri Hayek

References

External links

 
Verbenaceae genera